Khalil Ibrahim (1957–2011) was the founder of the Justice and Equality Movement, Sudan.

Khalil Ibrahim or Ibrahim Khalil may also refer to:

 Khalil Ibrahim (artist) (born 1934), Malaysian artist
 Ibrahim Khalil (diver) (born 1909), former Egyptian diver
 Khalil Ibrahim (footballer) (born 1993), Emirati footballer
 Ibrahim Khalil (playwright), Bangladeshi writer and playwright
 Ibrahim Khalil (politician), Bangladeshi politician
 Ibrahim Khalil (singer), Yazidi singer and songwriter
 Ibrahim Mohammed Khalil, suspected al Qaida facilitator
 Ibrahim Khaleel (born 1982), Indian cricketer
 One of the four bloggers whose arrests precipitated the 2013 Bengali blog blackout